The 1986 Indianapolis Colts season was the 34th season for the team in the National Football League (NFL) and third in Indianapolis. The team finished the year with a record of 3 wins and 13 losses, placing last in AFC East division.

The Colts did not win a game until Week 14, when they defeated the Atlanta Falcons. Prior to that, at least one sportswriter had theorized that the Colts wanted to finish with an 0-16 record, believing that they needed a franchise quarterback; as it turned out, Miami quarterback Vinny Testaverde was the consensus overall top pick in the forthcoming draft (although there were fears that he, like John Elway in 1983, would refuse to play for the team if they drafted him). The Colts’ record, which included wins in their final two games, ended up not being the worst in the league; the Tampa Bay Buccaneers finished with a 2-14 record and got the first pick (which they would eventually use on Testaverde).

Rod Dowhower entered the season in his second year as head coach, after having replaced Frank Kush in 1985. After the 0-13 start for the team, he was fired and replaced by Ron Meyer, who had himself been fired by the New England Patriots in 1984 and had not coached since. Meyer would lead the Colts to all three of their victories in 1986.

Personnel

Staff

Roster

Schedule

Standings

References

See also 
 History of the Indianapolis Colts
 List of Indianapolis Colts seasons
 Colts–Patriots rivalry

Indianapolis Colts
Indianapolis Colts seasons
Baltimore